Festival N°6 (Festival Number 6) is an annual art and music festival held in and around Portmeirion, Wales. The festival presents a wide range of music genres across multiple stages. It is advertised as a family-friendly festival, and as such various areas of the festival are targeted to families, such as "No.6's Mischief Meadow" for children and a designated family camping area. In 2013 one of the organizers stated that due to the size of the village the festival was not likely to grow beyond 10,000 attendees across the weekend.

In July 2018 the festival organisers announced that the festival would be taking an indefinite break.

Overview
The first event took place on 14 September 2012; around 6,500 people attended the festival. It has returned every year since, as of 2017.

Village of Portmeirion

The festival takes place in North Wales in the village of Portmeirion on the Snowdonia coast in the Welsh county of Gwynedd. The village location is composed of many edifices inspired by the architecture of an Italian coastal town. Portmeirion village was built between 1925 and 1978 by the architect Sir Clough Williams-Ellis. The festival takes place throughout the village, with the main music events located in adjacent fields; the typical Italian infrastructures show an atypical side of Portmeirion village which is part of the festival atmosphere. The music events and activities range from the Colonnade Gardens to the River Dwyryd, from the Tanglewoods to the beach.

The Prisoner

The festival's name is based on the cult TV show The Prisoner, which was filmed largely on location at Portmeirion. The main character is called "Number 6", and was played by the actor Patrick McGoohan. In the series, Number 6 is a secret agent held as a prisoner in a mysterious coastal village. This TV show is iconic of the village and made it famous internationally.

Art, culture and other activities
The N°6 Festival includes live music, poetry readings, comedy, talks and other cultural activities. The festival also includes a range of participative activities to complement the mainstream music events and develop differentiation from other music festivals. These have included "Giant Mind", "Urban Sketching", and "Extraordinary Bubbles".

The Slow Readers Club released a mini-album on 4 May 2018, recorded with Joe Duddell at Portmeirion Town Hall called Live From Festival No.6.

BBC Radio Wales also regularly broadcast live from the festival, with DJs Adam Walton and Bethan Elfyn presenting shows from the site.

Artists
Since 2012 Festival N°6 has hosted hundreds of musical artists and many other artists performing comedy, talks or performance art. The 2012 festival was in partnership with Electric Elephant Festival. Artists that performed since 2012 have included:

Accommodation
During the event, Portmeirion's village offers visitors a limited availability of accommodation in the village itself. Visitors also have the possibility to make a reservation in hotels, bunk houses, cottages, camper vans, yurts, tipis and tents.

Controversy
Ticket prices in 2013 had almost doubled after the success of the first year.
In 2016, 200 people had to take shelter in a leisure centre in Porthmadog after the car park for the park-and-ride service flooded and cars became stuck. The organisers were condemned for putting the car park on a flood plain despite having been issued with flood warnings due to heavy rainfall.

References

External links

Arts festivals in Wales
Tourist attractions in Gwynedd
The Prisoner
2012 establishments in Wales
Recurring events established in 2012